Infernal (subtitled Hell's Vengeance on the console port) is a third-person action video game for Microsoft Windows, produced by Polish developer Metropolis Software and published by Playlogic Entertainment and Eidos Interactive in 2007. A console port, Infernal: Hell's Vengeance, was released on 30 June 2009 for Xbox 360.

Infernal is a modern-style third-person shooter with major first-person shooter influences. Players control protagonist Ryan Lennox, a former angel turned dark by unfortunate circumstances who has access to a number of unique demonic powers, including pyrokinesis, teleportation and the ability to feed on the souls of fallen enemies.

Reception 

Infernal received mixed reviews according to the review aggregation website Metacritic.

Most of the reviews state that the game lacked polish and called it last generation compared to current third-person shooters of the time such as Gears of War and Resident Evil 4. On the other hand, some reviews said it had good graphics and called it "mindless fun".

Hell's Vengeance

Infernal: Hell's Vengeance received "unfavourable" reviews according to the review aggregation website Metacritic. In Japan, where the game was ported and published by Russel on 24 December 2009, Famitsu gave it a score of one six, one seven, one six, and one five for a total of 24 out of 40, while Famitsu Xbox 360 gave it a score of one six, one seven, and two sixes for a total of 25 out of 40.

References

External links 
 
Infernal: Hell's Vengeance at Playlogic

2007 video games
2009 video games
Action-adventure games
Video games about angels
Video games about demons
Eidos Interactive games
Video games developed in Poland
Windows games
Xbox 360 games
Third-person shooters
Video games using PhysX
Playlogic Entertainment games
Metropolis Software games
Single-player video games